The Act is an American true crime drama limited series that premiered in eight parts on March 20, 2019, on Hulu. The plot is based on the life of Gypsy Rose Blanchard and the murder of her mother, Dee Dee Blanchard, who was accused of abusing her daughter by fabricating illness and disabilities as a direct consequence of Munchausen syndrome by proxy. Joey King portrayed Gypsy, while Patricia Arquette played her mother, Dee Dee Blanchard. AnnaSophia Robb, Chloë Sevigny, and Calum Worthy star in supporting roles.

At the 71st Primetime Emmy Awards, Arquette won for Outstanding Supporting Actress in a Limited Series and King received a nomination for Outstanding Lead Actress in a Limited Series.

Premise 
The series follows the story of Gypsy Blanchard (Joey King), who uses a wheelchair due to an illness. Growing up, her relationship with her overprotective mother (Patricia Arquette) begins to sour as she increasingly insists on her independence. She rebels as her mother, who dedicated her life to her care, grows more protective, controlling and abusive, particularly amid her attempt to explore her sexuality.

The relationship turns even more toxic as Gypsy discovers many secrets. She grew up believing she was sick with cancer but discovers that she was not sick at all. Her mother Dee Dee successfully deceived not only Gypsy but also her family, friends, and medical professionals into believing her child was ill. It is suggested that she suffers from factitious disorder imposed on another, a mental illness in which a caregiver exaggerates or fakes another person's illness. At the time, this disorder was classified as Munchausen syndrome by proxy, by which it is still commonly known. The narrative eventually leads to murder after Gypsy asks her boyfriend to kill her mother.

Cast and characters

Main
 Patricia Arquette as Dee Dee Blanchard, Gypsy's mother and Emma's daughter
 Joey King as Gypsy Blanchard, Dee Dee's daughter and Emma's granddaughter. King shaved her head for the role.
 AnnaSophia Robb as Lacey, an original character in the show based on Aleah Woodmansee.
 Chloë Sevigny as Mel, Lacey's mother who is an original character in the show based on Amy Pinegar.
 Calum Worthy as Nick Godejohn, Gypsy's boyfriend who murders Dee Dee under Gypsy's order so they can be together.

Recurring
 Denitra Isler as Shelly, a neighbor who is close to the Blanchards, Mel, and Lacey.
 Steve Coulter as Dr. Evan Harley
 José Alfredo Fernandez as Officer Cox
 Poorna Jagannathan as Dr. Lakshmi Chandra

Guest
 Dean Norris as Russ, a man who was attracted to Dee Dee in 2011.
 Joe Tippett as Scott, Gypsy's older love interest whom she met at a comic book convention in 2011.
 Brooke Smith as Myra, Dee Dee's attorney
 Margo Martindale as Emma Blanchard, Dee Dee's mother and Gypsy's grandmother
 Rhea Seehorn as Janet, Dee Dee's cousin
 Juliette Lewis as Kathy Godejohn, Nick's mother
 John Ales as Vance Godejohn, Nick's father
 Adam Arkin as a Springfield, Missouri detective who tracks down Gypsy and Nick in Wisconsin and interviews Gypsy after her arrest.
 Joe Knezevich as Prosecutor Rippy, Nick's lawyer based on Dan Patterson.
 Molly Ephraim as Kate, Gypsy's lawyer based on Mike Stanfield.
 Cliff Chamberlain as Rod Blanchard, Dee Dee's ex-husband and Gypsy's father. He left Dee Dee before Gypsy was born after he didn't know how to love her, as Rod was 17 while Dee Dee was 24.

Episodes

Production

Development
On July 21, 2017, Hulu confirmed it had put the production into development. The potential series was expected to be written by Michelle Dean and Nick Antosca based on Dean's BuzzFeed article "Dee Dee Wanted Her Daughter To Be Sick, Gypsy Wanted Her Mom To Be Murdered". Writ Large, who acquired the screen rights to the article in 2016, was set to produce. Production companies involved with the series included Universal Cable Productions.

On May 18, 2018, it was reported that Hulu had given the production a series order. It was further announced that Dean and Antosca would serve as co-showrunners and executive produce alongside Greg Shephard and Britton Rizzio. On August 1, 2018, it was announced that Laure de Clermont-Tonnerre would direct the series' first episode. On December 20, 2018, it was announced that the series would premiere on March 20, 2019. On March 11, 2019, Jeff Russo was announced to be the show's composer.

Casting
In September 2018, it was announced that Patricia Arquette, Joey King, Chloë Sevigny, and AnnaSophia Robb had been cast in starring roles. On October 2, 2018, it was reported that Calum Worthy had joined the cast in a starring role.

In April 2019, Kristy Blanchard, stepmother of Gypsy Blanchard, stated that she was unhappy with how Aleah Woodmansee was portrayed in the show. While Woodmansee's name isn't mentioned, Robb's character Lacey originates from her. Blanchard stated that there was a scene in the second episode where Lacey gave Gypsy a cigarette, which in reality, did not happen. In an interview with Vulture, Blanchard stated: "She is the total opposite of that. It hurts Aleah because she lives in Springfield, and people are going to look at her differently and she's scared that it affects her job and reputation." Woodmansee also took issue with the choice to have Robb speak in a twangy accent, adding, "I'm not a fan of the whole hillbilly tone."

Filming
Principal photography for the series took place from October 2018 to February 2019 in Effingham County, Georgia.

Multiple scenes were filmed at the Savannah Mall and in Episode 8 scenes were filmed at the Bryan County Courthouse.

Controversy
On April 4, 2019, Gypsy Blanchard stated that she would be taking legal action towards The Act and Dean, its creator. While Blanchard was not able to watch the show in prison, she stated: "I feel it is very unfair and unprofessional that producers and co-producer Michelle Dean has used my actual name and story without my consent, and the life rights to do so". However, screenwriter Franchesca Macelli told Vulture regarding Gypsy's statement "it was from her own place of anger and disappointment and frustration" and that "nobody is taking legal action". Macelli stated that they will be looking into the legal rights for their actions, either cancelling the show or making its storyline right.

Kristy Blanchard, Gypsy's stepmother, accused Dean of breaking a promise to share the financial proceeds from the show with Gypsy, saying: "We were on a phone conversation, and she had told me that whatever she made, it didn't matter what it was, she was gonna send us 50 percent of what she made and she was gonna keep 50 percent."

Reception

Critical response
The first season received highly positive reviews from critics. On review aggregator Rotten Tomatoes, the season has an approval rating of 88% based on 49 reviews, with an average rating of 7.4/10. The website's critical consensus reads, "Disturbingly nuanced performances from Patricia Arquette and Joey King make The Act a convincing case for the ongoing dramatization of true crime stories." On Metacritic, it has a weighted average score of 73 out of 100 based on 17 critics, indicating "generally favorable reviews".

Awards and nominations

References

External links
 
 

2010s American drama television series
2019 American television series debuts
2010s American anthology television series
American biographical series
English-language television shows
Fraud in television
True crime television series
Hulu original programming
Television series by Universal Content Productions